Tomnatek is the Hungarian name for two villages in Romania:

 Tomnatic village, Vadu Crișului Commune, Bihor County
 Tomnatec village, Bulzeștii de Sus Commune, Hunedoara County